Changwaon FC may refer to:

 Changwon City FC, founded 2005
 Changwon United FC (formerly Changwon Doodae FC), 1988-2008